4th Otdelenie Gosudarstvennoy Selektsionnoy Stantsii is a rural locality (a settlement) in Tulunsky District, Russia. The population was 883 as of 2012.

Geography 
The settlement is located 7 km southwest of Tulun (the district's administrative centre) by road. Tulun is the nearest rural locality.

Streets 
 Markina
 Masterskaya
 Mekhanizatorskaya
 Michurina
 Molodezhnaya
 Nauchnaya
 Pisareva
 Polyakova
 Sadovaya
 Teplichnaya
 Chapaeva

References

External links 
 4th Otdelenie Gosudarstvennoy Selektsionnoy Stantsii on streetvi.ru

Rural localities in Irkutsk Oblast